Katarzyna Hall (née Kończa), (born 15 March 1957 in Gdańsk) is a Polish teacher, educational and social activist, and local government clerk. She was the Minister of National Education of the Republic of Poland from 2007 to 2011. In 2008, she invited Ivan Shyla to continue his education in Poland when he was kept from sitting for his final exam by Belarusian authorities.

References 

1957 births
Living people
Women government ministers of Poland
Politicians from Gdańsk
University of Gdańsk alumni
Education ministers of Poland
Members of the Polish Sejm 2011–2015
21st-century Polish women politicians